Norman Ray "Doc" Walker (July 28, 1889 – April 5, 1949) was a Canadian-born American pharmacist and politician, best known as the longest-serving member of Alaska's territorial legislature.  Born in Regina, Saskatchewan, Walker emigrated to the United States as a youth, later serving in the United States Army and attending Washington State University. He was a pharmacist in Seattle, Washington and then moved to Ketchikan, Alaska and owned the Walker-Broderick House. Walker served as mayor of Ketchikan from 1930 to 1932 and then served in the Alaska Territorial Senate from 1933 until 1947. He lost reelection to his Senate seat in 1948 after feuding with territorial governor Ernest Gruening over Gruening's efforts to overhaul the territory's tax structure.  Walker was also head of the Alaska Territorial Pharmacy Board.

References

External links
 Doc Walker at 100 Years of Alaska's Legislature

1889 births
1949 deaths
American military personnel of World War I
American pharmacists
Canadian emigrants to the United States
Mayors of places in Alaska
Members of the Alaska Territorial Legislature
People from Ketchikan Gateway Borough, Alaska
People from Regina, Saskatchewan
Politicians from Seattle
Presidents of the Alaska Senate
Democratic Party Alaska state senators
Washington State University alumni
20th-century American politicians